Flament is a French surname. Notable people with the surname include:

Didier Flament (born 1951), French fencer
Flavie Flament (born 1974), French television and radio presenter
Léon Flament (1906–?), Belgian rower

See also
Flamant (disambiguation)

French-language surnames